The 1966 Miami Dolphins season was the team's inaugural year as an expansion franchise in the American Football League (AFL). The Dolphins were the first of two expansion teams in the AFL, founded by Minneapolis attorney-politician Joe Robbie and actor-comedian  Future Harlem Globetrotters and Montreal Canadiens owner George N. Gillett, Jr. was a minority partner, and the team was led by head coach  The franchise was granted in August 1965 for 

Their regular season debut on September 2 began with Joe Auer returning the opening kickoff 95 yards for a touchdown, but the Dolphins lost to the Oakland Raiders,  Auer was the leading scorer for the season and was named team MVP. With an odd number of teams, each of the nine AFL teams had two bye weeks and played fourteen games. Miami lost its first five games before beating the Denver Broncos in the Orange Bowl. The Dolphins defeated the Houston Oilers the following week for their first road win in franchise history, but then lost the next six consecutive games. In Week 16, Miami won against the Oilers again to finish the season with a 3–11 record. Having defeated the Oilers twice, the Dolphins became the first ever expansion team in the Super Bowl era to sweep a division rival, and the last until the Jacksonville Jaguars did it in 1995 against the Cleveland Browns.

Offseason

AFL Draft 

With the first pick overall, the Dolphins selected running back Jim Grabowski out of the University of Illinois. Grabowski was also drafted by the Green Bay Packers in the National Football League's draft. The result was a bidding war between the two franchises to obtain Grabowski's services. The Packers signed Grabowski and he played for them for five seasons.

Personnel

Staff

Roster

Schedule

Pre-season

Regular season 
Two bye weeks were necessary in 1966, as the league expanded to an odd-number (9) of teams; one team was idle each week (three teams were idle in week one). The Dolphins played three teams from each division twice, and one in each once (Boston, San Diego)

Game summaries

Week 1 

    
    
    
    
    
    

The Dolphins' regular season debut was a home game against the Oakland Raiders on Friday night, September 2; Miami running back Joe Auer returned the opening kickoff 95 yards for  An extra point kick by Gene Mingo allowed the Dolphins to lead 7–0 barely into the start of the game. Miami was unable to retain the lead, however, with the Raiders scoring a field goal in the second quarter and two touchdowns (one each in the second and third quarters) – a total of 17 points. In the fourth quarter, the Dolphins narrowed the score with a touchdown reception from Rick Norton to Rick Casares. However, Oakland responded with another touchdown – a 16 yard pass to Tom Mitchell from Tom Flores. The game ended with a 23–14 loss for Miami.

Week 2 

    
    
    
    
    
    

In their first ever intradivisional game, the Dolphins played against the AFL Eastern Division rival New York Jets at the Orange Bowl on Friday night,  Miami trailed the entire game, with the Jets scoring a safety (by tackling Rick Norton in the end zone) and a touchdown in the first quarter. New York added a field goal and a touchdown in the third quarter, while holding Miami scoreless until the fourth quarter. By then, the Dolphins scored a touchdown – a 43-yard reception from Norton to Dave Kocourek. Later in the quarter, Jets quarterback Joe Namath was intercepted by defensive back Pete Jaquess, who returned the ball 27 yards for another touchdown. However, Miami was unable to complete a comeback and lost

Week 3 

    
    
    
    
    
    
    
    
    
    
    
    
    

For their first division rivalry game against the Buffalo Bills on September 18, Miami traveled to the War Memorial Stadium in Buffalo. The Bills dominated the Dolphins throughout the game. In the first quarter, the Buffalo scored three touchdown before Miami kicked a field goal. The Bills then added four touchdowns in the second quarter, versus one by the Dolphins. After the first half, the score was 48–10 in favor of the Bills. The only score in the third quarter was a field goal by Booth Lusteg of Buffalo. Three touchdowns were scored in the fourth quarter, two for Miami and one for Buffalo. The Bills defeated the Dolphins by a score of 58–24, which remains one of the worst losses by Miami in the history of the Bills–Dolphins rivalry.

Week 5 

    
    
    
    
    
    
    
    
    

Coming off their first bye week, the Miami Dolphins traveled to Balboa Stadium in San Diego in Week 5 in search for their first win. The Dolphins began the game with a 10 point lead – a field goal by Gene Mingo and a Karl Noonan touchdown via a 20 yard pass from Dick Wood. However, the Chargers took the lead in the third quarter following two touchdowns and a field goal, with a score of 16–10 as the quarter ended. In the fourth quarter, San Diego put the game away and delivered another blowout for Miami, scoring four touchdowns (28 points), while preventing the Dolphins from receiving additional points. The game ended with a score of 44–10 in favor of the Chargers. The Dolphins win–loss record fell to 0–4.

Week 6 

    
    
    
    
    

In a second game against the Oakland Raiders on October 9, the Miami Dolphins traveled to the Oakland–Alameda County Coliseum. Miami took the lead in the first quarter, with a 47 yard field goal by Gene Mingo. In the second quarter, Oakland took the lead after a touchdown, while Miami re-took the lead with a touchdown of their own. However, before the end of the second quarter, Oakland again re-took the lead with another touchdown. The first half of the game ended with a score of 14–10 in favor of the Raiders. Neither team received additional points in the third quarter. Oakland put the game away in the fourth quarter by scoring another touchdown. The match ended with a 21–10 loss for Miami.

Week 7 

    
    
    
    
    

After being on the road since Week 3, the Miami Dolphins returned home in Week 7 for a contest against the Denver Broncos on October 16. Miami scored a touchdown and field goal in the first quarter, with a 67 yard pass from George Wilson to Billy Joe and a Gene Mingo field goal. The Broncos scored a touchdown later in the first quarter. Subsequently, the Dolphins scored one touchdown each in the third and fourth quarters – 1 yard and 3 yard rushes by Joe Auer, respectively. However, Denver was unable to earn additional points following the first quarter. As a result, the Miami Dolphins won the game by a score of 24–7. This was the first win by the franchise and raised their win–loss record to 1–5.

Week 8 

    
    
    
    
    
    
    

The Dolphins returned to the road again in Week 8, traveling to Rice Stadium to take on the Houston Oilers on October 23. Miami scored first with a touchdown in the first quarter – an 80 yard reception from George Wilson to Bo Roberson. George Blanda of the Oilers kicked a field goal in the second quarter, but the Dolphins responded with another touchdown. In the third quarter, Blanda kicked another field goal, but Gene Mingo of the Dolphins also scored a field goal. Houston finally reached the endzone later in the third quarter to narrow the match to a 4-point game. However, Mingo kicked another field goal in the fourth quarter, ending the game with a 20–13 win for Miami. The Dolphins improved to 2–5.

Week 10 

    
    
    
    
    
    

After the second bye week, Miami returned home for another game against the Buffalo Bills on November 6. As during Week 3, the Bills again dominated the match. After neither club scored in the first quarter, Buffalo scored a touchdown and a field goal in both the second and third quarters. In the fourth quarter, the Bills scored a third touchdown. Later, Buffalo received two points from a safety after Marty Schottenheimer blocked a punt. Miami was unable to score points throughout the game and lost 29–0, their first regular season shutout loss. The Dolphins fell to 2–6.

Week 11 

    
    
    
    
    
    
    
    
    

In the following week, the Dolphins traveled to Municipal Stadium to take on the Kansas City Chiefs. However, Miami was quickly overtaken. Kansas City reached a 23 point lead – three touchdowns (one missed extra point) and one field goal – before the Dolphins finally scored a field goal in the second quarter. Miami followed up with a touchdown, but Kansas City scored another touchdown before the end of the quarter. In the third quarter, the Chiefs added another field goal to their score. The Dolphins scored another touchdown in the fourth quarter, but the team fell well short of making a comeback. The game ended with a 34–16 loss for Miami, with their record falling to 2–7.

Week 12 

    
    
    
    
    
    
    
    
    

During Week 12, the Dolphins traveled to Shea Stadium in New York City for their second match-up against the Jets on November 20. Miami built a six point lead in the first quarter with two field goals by Gene Mingo. However, they would not maintain their lead. In the second quarter, the Jets scored a touchdown and a field goal, before adding another touchdown and two additional field goals in the third quarter. Miami, down 23–6 at the close of the third quarter, finally scored again with a touchdown in the fourth quarter. The Dolphins were unable to overcome the deficit, and New York scored another touchdown before the end of regulation. The game ended with a 30–13 loss for Miami, dropping their record to 2–8.

Week 13 

    
    
    
    
    
    

In their first game against the division rival Boston Patriots, the Dolphins hosted the Patriots at the Orange Bowl on November 27. After neither team scored in the first quarter, the Patriots scored twice in the first quarter, with a touchdown pass from Babe Parilli to Art Graham and then a 32-yard field goal by Gino Cappelletti. The first half of the game closed with a 13-0 lead for Boston. A rushing touchdown by Jim Nance allowed the Patriots to increase their lead to 20-0. Later in the third quarter, the Dolphins finally scored with a 32-yard pass from Dick Wood to Frank Jackson. In the fourth quarter, another Miami touchdown pass from Wood to Joe Auer for 38 yards further reduced the Patriots lead to 20-14. However, with no additional scores by either team, the game ended with a 20-14 loss for the Miami Dolphins, causing them to fall to 2-9.

Week 14 

    
    
    
    

For Week 14, the Dolphins traveled to Bears Stadium in Denver for another game against the Broncos on December 4. The game was a low-scoring affair. After neither team scored in the first quarter, Denver put points on the board with a Gary Kroner field goal, before Miami countered with Tom Erlandson scoring a touchdown after returning an interception 26 yards. However, the Broncos responded with a touchdown before the end of the second quarter. Denver scored another touchdown in the third quarter. Following that, neither Miami nor Denver any additional points in the third or fourth quarter. The game ended with a 17–7 loss for Miami, dropping their record to 2–10.

Week 15 

    
    
    
    
    
    
    

Miami returned home for their second match against Kansas City on December 11. The Chiefs opened up with two Mike Mercer field goals, with one each in the first and second quarters. Later in the second quarter, the Dolphins scored a field goal and a touchdown (with a 2-point conversion) to close the first half 11–6. After no scores in the third quarter, Kansas City was the first team to put more points on the board with a touchdown in the fourth quarter. Miami then scored another touchdown to take the lead in the fourth quarter. However, the Chiefs countered with a touchdown before the game ended. Miami lost by a score of 19–18.

Week 16 

    
    
    
    
    
    
    
    

In the final game of their inaugural season, the Dolphins hosted the Oilers at the Orange Bowl on December 18. The Oilers mounted a 14-0 lead before the Dolphins scored – a 27-yard pass from Don Trull to Hoyle Granger in the first quarter and an 11-yard pass from Trull to Larry Elkins. Miami then responded with a 27-yard pass from John Stofa to Joe Auer and a successful 2-point conversion. Houston added seven more points with a 2-yard pass from Trull to Bob McLeod. By the end of the first half of the game, the Oilers led by 21-8. The third quarter saw a 48-yard touchdown pass from Stofa to Frank Jackson, cutting the Oilers' lead to 21-15. In the fourth quarter, Houston scored again with a 1-yard rush from Trull. The Dolphins scored a pair of touchdowns in the fourth quarter, via a 4-yard pass from Stofa to Bill Cronin and a 14-yard pass from Stofa to Auer. With no further scores by either team, the game ended with a 29-28 win for the Miami Dolphins. Miami ended their season with a win–loss record of 3-11.

Standings

Awards and honors 
 Tom Erlandson, American Football League All-Star game selection
 Jimmy Warren, American Football League All-Star game selection
 Willie West, American Football League All-Star game selection

References

External links 
 1966 Miami Dolphins at Pro-Football-Reference.com

Miami Dolphins seasons
Miami
Miami Dolphins